The Vijay Award for Entertainer of the Year is given by STAR Vijay as part of its annual Vijay Awards ceremony for Tamil  (Kollywood) films. Vijay and Dhanush has won the award most number of times (3 times each).

The list
Here is a list of the award winners and the films for which they won.

See also
 Tamil cinema
 Cinema of India

References

Entertainer